Kolgaon is a village in the Ferozepur Jhirka sub-division of Nuh District, Haryana state, India.

It is located in the Mewat region of Haryana.

Geography
It is located next to Aravalli range on the foothill of Kalinjar-Mohun-Kolgaon ridge of Delhi Supergroup.

Demography 
It had a population of 2862 in 498 houses as per 2011 Census of India. 1497 of the population were noted as male and 1365 female.

Administration
The village local governance is managed by the elected panchayat headed by the Sarpanch.

See also 
 Bhiwadi
 Bhadas
 Gurgaon
 Moolthan

References 

Villages in Nuh district